Football in Czechoslovakia was one of the most popular sports during that nation's existence, and continues to be popular in both of the nations that followed, the Czech Republic and in Slovakia.

History

On March 26, 1922, the Czechoslovak Football Federation was founded. It consisted of the Czechoslovakian Football Association (Československý svaz footballový), the German Football Association, the Hungarian Football Association, the Jewish Confederation and the Polish Association. On May 20, 1923, the Czechoslovak Football Federation was admitted to FIFA.

Domestic football

National team

The Czechs were a football world power in the 20th Century with their greatest achievement being winning 1976 European Championship against West Germany in the penalty shoot-out, thanks to the famous penalty of Antonin Panenka, they were also instrumental in forming football competitions in the  early 20th Century. The Czechoslovak team qualified for the World Cup on eight occasions, finishing runner-up in the editions of 1934 and 1962, and for the European Championship in other three.

The country dissolved in 1993. It was split into the  Slovakia national football team and the  Czech Republic national football team.

References